Taheva Parish was a rural municipality of Estonia, in Valga County.

Settlements
Villages
Hargla - Kalliküla - Koikküla - Koiva - Korkuna - Laanemetsa - Lepa - Lutsu - Nakatu - Ringiste - Sooblase - Taheva - Tõrvase - Tsirgumäe

References